El Hadji Malick Ndiaye (born 18 November 1986) is a Senegalese professional basketball player.

He represented Senegal's national basketball team at the 2016 Olympic Qualifiers in the Philippines, where he recorded most steals for his team.

References

External links

 FIBA profile
 Afrobasket.com 
 REAL GM profile

1986 births
Living people
DUC Dakar players
Shooting guards
Senegalese expatriate basketball people in Saudi Arabia
Senegalese expatriate basketball people in Tunisia
Senegalese men's basketball players
Sportspeople from Thiès